Propylene glycol methyl ether (PGME or 1-methoxy-2-propanol) is an organic solvent with a wide variety of industrial and commercial uses. Similar to other glycol ethers, it is used as a carrier/solvent in printing/writing inks and paints/coatings. It also finds use as an industrial and commercial paint stripper.  It is used as an antifreeze in diesel engines.

See also
 Di(propylene glycol) methyl ether

References

Glycol ethers
Secondary alcohols
Alcohol solvents
Ether solvents